Ffynone House School is a private co-educational secondary day school in Swansea, Wales.  It is situated in the Uplands area of the city at 36 St. James Crescent.

The school teaches children from age 11 to 18 (Year 7 to GCSE and A Level). It is owned by a charitable trust.

Description
Ffynone campus is situated next to St. James's Park in the Uplands area of Swansea.

Facilities in Ffynone House School include a learning resource centre, laboratories, gymnasium, a drama studio, a music room and two art studios in addition to two computer suites.

Classes are relatively small. All pupils follow a common curriculum considered compulsory by educational authorities up until the end of GCSE.

Ffynone has a tradition of extra-curricular sporting activities, including table tennis, football, rugby, hockey, cross-country and gymnastics, taking place at lunch-times and after school. The school has no playing fields of its own but instead, pupils use facilities at the nearby Swansea University. Pupils have access to other activities, such as debating, music, drama, dance as part of the curriculum and as extra-curricular activities.

History
Ffynone House School is located on the site that was formerly St Winefride's Convent School for Girls, run by nuns from 1887 to 1969 and throughout the Second World War. Ffynone House School was opened in 1973 by Swansea businessman Marshall David, and became Ffynone House School Trust (FHST) following the latter's death.

The School's early motto "Non Sibi Sed Omnibus" (Not for one's self, but for all) was updated to "Where Individuals Matter", which underpins the ethos of the school. The early school badge proclaiming "Endeavour-Achievement-Excellence" was updated to "Virtus" (Virtue) in 1995. The addition of a yellow Acorn to the badge reflected the purchase of Oakleigh House Primary School as part of the growing Ffynone House School Trust.

In 2007, both primary and secondary school businesses were purchased by Cognita, a private education consortium. The capital assets and freeholds of both schools remained the property of FHST. In 2013, Cognita considered the viability of maintaining the school in its current form which was located on two separate sites.  The primary and secondary schools were subsequently separated; the Oakleigh House primary department remained inside the Cognita consortium, and Ffynone House School’s secondary department was transferred back to the ownership of the FHS Charitable Trust. The school remains open as an independent day school in the Uplands area of Swansea.

Science
Ffynone House School offers Chemistry, Biology and Physics as independent subjects throughout the School. Pupils from the school regularly participate in science-based competitions and have enjoyed success in the South West Wales Chemical Olympiad Competition. In 2009 the school Chemical Olympiad team came third in the UK in the Royal Society of Chemistry 'Top of the Bench' competition.

2019 exam results
All qualifications, with the exception of ICT, are graded using the 9-1 system. Over half of all grades were at level 7 or above (equivalent to the old A/A*) with 19% at level 9.

100% of students studying Latin or Classical Civilisation attained an A*. In Mathematics, 83% of entries were graded level 7 or above (equivalent to the old grade A) with 50% at level 9-8 (A*). 58% of Chemistry grades were at level 9 and over 75% of Biology and Chemistry grades were levels 9–7.  83% of all History entrants scored level 7 or above.

Headteachers
 Audrey Jackson 1973–1983
 Rev Howard Jones 1983–1984
 John Rhys Thomas 1984–2004
 Edwina Jones 2004–2008
 Nicola Walker 2009–2015
 Michael Boulding 2015–present

References

External links 
 Ffynone House School
2019 Estyn Inspection Report

Private schools in Swansea
Educational institutions established in 1973
1973 establishments in Wales